Hugh Calverley may refer to:

 Hugh Calveley (died 1394 or 1394), English knight and military commander
Hugh Calverley (MP) (1578–1606), MP for Liverpool
 Hugh Calverley (hunter), silk weaver of the City of London